The National Democratic Alliance (NDA) is a group of Sudanese political parties that was formed in 1989 to oppose the regime of Omar Hassan al-Bashir after he seized power in a military coup on June 6, 1989.  The NDA signed a deal with the Sudanese government on June 18, 2005, following a peace agreement to end the Second Sudanese Civil War on January 9, 2005.  Some issues have yet to be resolved by opposing factions, including the conflict and humanitarian issues in the war-torn region of Darfur. After further violent clashes in the east, a separate peace deal was signed with the Beja Congress in October 2006.

The Leadership Council of the NDA includes the following organizations:
 The Democratic Unionist Party (DUP)
 The Umma Party
 The Sudan People's Liberation Movement and Sudan People's Liberation Army (SPLM/SPLA)
 The Union of Sudan African Parties (USAP)
 The Communist Party of Sudan (CPS)
 The General Council of the Trade Unions Federations
 The Legitimate Command of the Sudanese Armed Forces
 The Beja Congress
 The Sudan Alliance Forces
 The Federal Democratic Alliance
 The Rashaida Free Lions
 The Arab Ba'ath Socialist Party
 Independent National Figures
 Representatives of the Liberated Areas
 Sudanese National Party

References

External links
National Democratic Alliance web site

Organizations associated with the Ba'ath Party
Political opposition organizations
Political party alliances in Sudan
Sudanese democracy movements